The Lay is a  river in the Vendée département, western France. Its source is at Saint-Pierre-du-Chemin and it flows generally southwest.

Its main tributaries are the Yon and the Smagne.

Communes along its course
This list is ordered from source to mouth: 
Vendée: Saint-Pierre-du-Chemin, Menomblet, Réaumur, Montournais, La Meilleraie-Tillay, Pouzauges, Le Boupère, Monsireigne, Saint-Prouant, Sigournais, Bazoges-en-Pareds, Chantonnay, La Réorthe, Bournezeau, Sainte-Hermine, Sainte-Pexine, Moutiers-sur-le-Lay, Bessay, Mareuil-sur-Lay-Dissais, La Couture, Péault, La Bretonnière-la-Claye, Rosnay, Le Champ-Saint-Père, Saint-Vincent-sur-Graon, Saint-Cyr-en-Talmondais, Curzon, Lairoux, Saint-Benoist-sur-Mer, Grues, Angles, La Faute-sur-Mer, L'Aiguillon-sur-Mer,

References

0Lay
Rivers of France
Rivers of Vendée
Rivers of Pays de la Loire